

"Hungry Stones" is a Bengali short story written by Rabindranath Tagore in 1895. 		

The story is about a tax collector, who is sent to a small town and stays at a former palace which is believed to be haunted. Every night, he becomes more consumed by the spirits of the inhabitants of the palace from the Mughal times and a beautiful Indian woman. 

Tagore was inspired to write this story after he had stayed in Shah Jahan's Moti Shahi Mahal palace Shahibaug, Ahmedabad, Gujarat, situated near the Sabarmati River (in the story this became the Shusta River). This was where Tagore's elder brother, Satyendranath, was serving as a judge at the time.

Adaptations
The story has been adapted a number of times as listed below:
Kshudhita Pashan by Tapan Sinha, 1960 Bengali film
Lekin... by Gulzar, 1991 Hindi film

Other ghost stories by Tagore
Tagore wrote several other ghost stories, including The Skeleton, Lost Jewels, In the Middle of the Night, and False Hope.

See also
 List of works of Rabindranath Tagore

References

1895 short stories
Works by Rabindranath Tagore
Indian short stories
Ghosts in written fiction
Short stories adapted into films